Chapter01/ is the eleventh Japanese single release from Hitomi Yaida. It is also the first single released from the album Here Today – Gone Tomorrow.
Also released as a limited edition with CD-Extra options with the associated PV's.

It peaked at number 9 in the Japanese charts on March 27, 2004.

Track listing

Notes

2004 singles
Hitomi Yaida songs
2004 songs
Songs written by Hitomi Yaida